EL/M-2226 is an over-the-horizon radar system developed by Israel Aerospace Industries. It is used for both civilian and military coastal monitoring.

References

Ground radars
Military radars of Israel